The Canton of Felletin is a canton situated in the Creuse département and in the Nouvelle-Aquitaine region of central France.

Geography 
An area of farming and wooded valleys, with the town of Felletin, in the arrondissement of Aubusson, at its centre. The altitude varies from  437m (Moutier-Rozeille) to 861m (Poussanges) with an average altitude of 596m.

Composition 
At the French canton reorganisation which came into effect in March 2015, the canton was expanded from 9 to 19 communes:
 
Croze
Faux-la-Montagne
Felletin
Féniers
Gentioux-Pigerolles
Gioux
Le Monteil-au-Vicomte
Moutier-Rozeille
La Nouaille
Poussanges
Royère-de-Vassivière
Sainte-Feyre-la-Montagne
Saint-Frion
Saint-Marc-à-Loubaud
Saint-Martin-Château
Saint-Quentin-la-Chabanne
Saint-Yrieix-la-Montagne
Vallière  
La Villedieu

See also 
 Arrondissements of the Creuse department
 Cantons of the Creuse department
 Communes of the Creuse department

References

Felletin